The 2016 Codasur South American Rally Championship is an international rally championship sanctioned by the FIA and run by the Confederacion Deportiva Automovilismo Sudamericana (Codasur). The championship was contested over five events held in five South American countries from April to November.

The championship was won for the fourth time by Paraguayan driver Gustavo Saba. Saba won the final three rallies to win the championship on the final day of the rally overcoming countryman Diego Domínguez who had led the championship all season after winning the first two rallies. Uruguayan driver Rodrigo Zeballos won a close competition for third in the championship

Event calendar and results

The 2016 Codasur South American Rally Championship was as follows:

Championship standings
The 2016 Codasur South American Rally Championship points were as follows:

References

External links

Codasur South American Rally Championship
Codasur South America
Codasur South American Rally Championship